Robert Joseph Sheheen (born January 21, 1943) is an American lawyer and politician. A Democrat, Sheheen served as Speaker of the South Carolina House of Representatives from 1986 to 1994. Sheheen was the first Lebanese-American to serve in the position.

Early life and education 
Sheheen was born in Camden, South Carolina. He received a bachelor's degree from Duke University in 1965 and a law degree from the University of South Carolina in 1968. Sheheen later received honorary degrees from The Citadel and Winthrop University.

Political career 
Sheheen was a member of the South Carolina House of Representatives from 1977 to 2000; he served as speaker from 1986 to 1994. Sheheen was Speaker of the House during the Operation Lost Trust scandal. He left the speakership in 1994 and was succeeded in the House of Representatives by his nephew, Vincent Sheheen, in 2000.

References

External links

USC Law School Profile

Living people
Duke University alumni
University of South Carolina alumni
South Carolina lawyers
Speakers of the South Carolina House of Representatives
Members of the South Carolina House of Representatives
1943 births

American people of Lebanese descent